Gerhard Lehmbruch (15 April 1928 – 12 June 2022) was a member of the University of Konstanz. 
Lehmbruch received a doctorate and a Habilitation in Political Science from the University of Tübingen. Thereafter, he was professor at the universities of Heidelberg, Tübingen and Konstanz, from 1969 to 1996.

Lehmbruch was Vice-president of the International Political Science Association  (1988-91) and president of the German Political Science Association (1991-1994). 

His research focused on German and comparative politics. He is a prominent researcher of liberal corporatism. He collaborated with Philippe C. Schmitter in his research on neo-corporatism.

Lehmbruch was awarded the ECPR Lifetime Achievement Award by the European Consortium for Political Research in 2009. He also received the Theodor-Eschenburg-Prize for his lifetime achievements of the German Political Science Association in 2003.

Selected publications
 Lehmbruch, Gerhard. 1977. "Liberal Corporatism and Party Government." Comparative Political Studies 10(1): 91-126.
 Schmitter, Philippe C., and Gerhard Lehmbruch (eds.). 1981. Trends Toward Corporatist Intermediation. London: Sage Publications. 
 Lehmbruch, Gerhard, and Philippe C. Schmitter. 1982. Patterns of Corporatist Policy-Making. London: Sage Publications.

References

1928 births
2022 deaths
German political scientists
Academic staff of the University of Konstanz
Academic staff of the University of Tübingen
Academic staff of Heidelberg University
University of Tübingen alumni
People from East Prussia
People from Königsberg